The Dorotea Formation is a geological formation in the Río de Las Chinas Valley of the Magallanes Basin in Patagonian Chile whose strata date back to the Campanian to Maastrichtian of the Late Cretaceous.

Description 
The Dorotea Formation was first described by Katz in 1963. The formation comprises sandstones with frequent conglomerate lenses, concretionary levels and claystones. The Dorotea Formation includes calcareous sandstones with abundant marine invertebrate and fragmentary vertebrate fossils. Hervé et al. (2004) obtained a maximum radiometric age of 67.4 ± 1.5 Ma from detrital zircons contained in sandstones of the Dorotea Formation.

The mudstones and sandstones of the formation were deposited in a fluvial environment. The formation conformably overlies the Tres Pasos Formation and is unconformably overlain by the Lutetian to Bartonian Man Aike Formation.

Fossil content 
The following fossils were reported from the formation:

 Amphibians
 Anura indet.
 Panchelidae indet.
 Reptiles
 Aristonectes sp.
 cf. Yaminuechelys sp.
 Aristonectinae indet.
 Elasmosauridae indet.
 Stegouros elengassen
 Sauropoda indet.
 Enantiornithes indet.
 Megaraptoridae indet.
 Ornithurae indet.
 Unenlagiinae indet.
 Theropoda indet.
 Ornithischia indet.
 Mammals
 Magallanodon baikashkenke
Orretherium tzen
 Mammalia indet.
 Fish
 Ischyrhiza chilensis
 Carcharias sp.
 Serratolamna indet.
 Insects
 Dorotheus guidensis
 Bivalves
 Pterotrigonia cazadoriana
 Ammonites
 Gunnarites sp.
 Pachydiscus aff. gollevilensis

See also 
 List of dinosaur-bearing rock formations
 Quiriquina Formation
 Allen Formation, Campanian to Maastrichtian fossiliferous formation of the Neuquén Basin
 Angostura Colorada Formation, Campanian to Maastrichtian fossiliferous formation of the North Patagonian Massif
 La Colonia Formation, Campanian to Maastrichtian formation of the Cañadón Asfalto Basin
 Colorado Formation, Campanian to Maastrichtian fossiliferous formation of the Colorado Basin
 Lago Colhué Huapí Formation, Campanian to Maastrichtian fossiliferous formation of the Golfo San Jorge Basin

References

Bibliography 

 
 
 
 
 

Geologic formations of Chile
Upper Cretaceous Series of South America
Cretaceous Chile
Maastrichtian Stage of South America
Campanian Stage
Sandstone formations
Shale formations
Conglomerate formations
Fluvial deposits
Shallow marine deposits
Formations
Fossiliferous stratigraphic units of South America
Paleontology in Chile
Geology of Patagonia
Formations